Alexandru Ioan Cuza is a village in Cahul District, Moldova.

Notable people
 Mihail Vântu 
 Gheorghe Hioară
 Ana Guțu
 Dumitru Remenco

References

Villages of Cahul District